Cristhian Ricardo Stuani Curbelo (born 12 October 1986) is a Uruguayan professional footballer who plays as a striker for Spanish club Girona.

He started out at Danubio, being bought by Reggina in 2008. He went on to spend the vast majority of his professional career in Spain, in representation of several clubs, most notably with Espanyol; he signed with Middlesbrough from England in 2015 and, two years later, joined Girona.

Stuani made his debut for Uruguay in 2012 and appeared for the nation at two World Cups and three Copa América tournaments. He also holds an Italian passport.

Club career

Danubio
Born in Tala, Canelones, Stuani started his professional career with Danubio. In 2005, he went on loan to Bella Vista in the Uruguayan Segunda División, performing well enough to be recalled.

Reggina
In January 2008, after scoring 19 goals in the 2007 Apertura with Danubio, Stuani was signed by Reggina in Italy, penning a four-year contract with the Serie A club. He made his official debut on the 12th, playing 30 minutes in a 1–1 away draw against Empoli.

When Stuani joined, the club was second from bottom and had the fewest goals scored in the league, following Rolando Bianchi's departure for Manchester City in the previous summer – he went scoreless in 12 games, but the Reggio Calabria team managed to retain their division status. In 2008–09, he scored his only league goal from a penalty kick in the last round, a 1–1 home draw against Siena, having only appeared in four more matches during the entire season, which ended in top-flight relegation.

On 31 July 2009, Stuani joined Albacete in the Segunda División, on loan. He finished the season with 22 goals in 39 games, including hat-tricks in victories over Castellón and Córdoba, putting him in second in the scoring charts behind Elche's Jorge Molina, but his team only finished two points above the relegation zone.

For 2010–11, Stuani remained in the country and on loan, but moved to La Liga with Levante. He was used mostly as a backup to Felipe Caicedo, but still contributed with eight goals – second-best in the squad – as the Valencians easily retained their division status, netting twice in a 3–1 home defeat of Málaga.

In the next season, Stuani was loaned to another side in the Spanish top flight, Racing de Santander. In December 2011, he scored a brace in each leg of the Copa del Rey tie against Rayo Vallecano, including a late penalty in the second game which secured a win on the away goals rule following a 6–6 aggregate draw.

Espanyol
In summer 2012, Stuani was linked with a move to Deportivo de La Coruña and even passed his medical but, on 28 August, he signed a four-year contract with Espanyol even though that club and Reggina had initially agreed on a season-long loan.

Stuani netted 12 times in his third and last year at the Estadi Cornellà-El Prat, only trailing Sergio García's 14 in his team.

Middlesbrough
On 15 July 2015, Middlesbrough reached an agreement for the transfer of Stuani, with the deal being completed after receiving international clearance on 7 August, for a rumoured €3 million fee. His first appearance in the Football League Championship occurred on 9 August, as he replaced Kike in the 77th minute of an eventual 0–0 away draw against Preston North End. Three days later he made his first start, in the opening round of the League Cup, scoring in each half of a 3–1 win over Oldham Athletic at Boundary Park; he scored a brace again in the second round on the 25th, as his team came from behind to win at Burton Albion.

Stuani scored his first league goal on 29 August 2015, concluding a 3–1 victory at Sheffield Wednesday. Seventeen days later, he netted twice in a victory of the same margin against Brentford at the Riverside Stadium.

On 28 December 2015, Stuani finished Stewart Downing's cross in the 44th second for the only goal of the home game against Wednesday, putting Middlesbrough on top of the table. He did not find the net again until the final game of the season on the following 7 May, opening a 1–1 home draw to Brighton & Hove Albion which won promotion to the Premier League at the opponents' expense; the goal's worth was valued at £170 million.

On 21 August 2016, Stuani scored his first goals in the top division in his first game in the competition, grabbing a brace against Sunderland in a 2–1 win at the Stadium of Light.

Girona
On 21 July 2017, Stuani joined Girona – newly promoted to the Spanish top flight – for an undisclosed fee. He made his debut for the club on 19 August, starting and scoring a brace in a 2–2 home draw against Atlético Madrid.

Stuani finished his first year in fifth place of the scoring charts at 21 goals, helping the Catalans easily retain their league status. On 10 March 2019, he became the club's all-time scorer in the top tier with 38 successful strikes after a 2–3 loss to Valencia at the Estadi Montilivi, surpassing former holder Jandro; despite totalling 19 during the season to repeat the same position in the scoring department, the team succumbed to relegation on the last matchday.

Subsequently, a number of clubs approached Stuani for a summer move, most notably champions FC Barcelona However, the player eventually put pen to a contract extension with until 2023. He missed the first two league games due to a groin injury, but scored in his first appearance on 1 September 2019 to help the hosts defeat Málaga 1–0; he added a hat-trick the following weekend, at home to Rayo Vallecano (3–1).

International career

Stuani made his senior debut for Uruguay on 14 November 2012, in a friendly with Poland (3–1 away win). On 10 September of the following year, he scored his first international goal, helping to a 2–0 home victory against Colombia for the 2014 FIFA World Cup qualifiers. On 13 November 2013, he netted the Charrúas second in their 5–0 win in Jordan for the playoffs first leg, finishing Nicolás Lodeiro's cross at close range.

Stuani was selected by manager Óscar Tabárez for the finals in Brazil. He scored in both of Uruguay's warm-up matches for the tournament, the only goal of the game against Northern Ireland after coming on at half-time for Diego Forlán, and the second in a 2–0 win over Slovenia. He made his tournament debut on 14 June, starting in a 3–1 loss to Costa Rica in Fortaleza, and added a further three bench appearances in a round-of-16 exit.

Stuani was named in Uruguay's squad the following year, as they attempted to defend their continental crown at the 2015 Copa América. He made two substitute appearances in Group B, in a quarter-final finish.

Stuani was included in the final 23-man squad for the 2018 World Cup in Russia. His first match in the competition took place on 30 June, when he replaced Edinson Cavani (who had scored twice) for the final 16 minutes of the 2–1 round-of-16 victory over Portugal. He started in the next match due to injury to the same teammate, and played 59 minutes in the 2–0 defeat against France.

Career statistics

Club

International

Scores and results list Uruguay's goal tally first, score column indicates score after each Stuani goal.

Honours
Danubio
Uruguayan Primera División: 2004

Uruguay
China Cup: 2018, 2019

Individual
Pichichi Trophy (Segunda División): 2019–20 (29 goals), 2021–22 (22 goals)
Segunda División Player of the Month: December 2021

References

External links

1986 births
Living people
People from Canelones Department
Uruguayan people of Italian descent
Uruguayan footballers
Association football forwards
Uruguayan Primera División players
Danubio F.C. players
C.A. Bella Vista players
Serie A players
Reggina 1914 players
La Liga players
Segunda División players
Albacete Balompié players
Levante UD footballers
Racing de Santander players
RCD Espanyol footballers
Girona FC players
Premier League players
English Football League players
Middlesbrough F.C. players
Uruguay international footballers
2014 FIFA World Cup players
2015 Copa América players
2018 FIFA World Cup players
2019 Copa América players
Copa América Centenario players
Uruguayan expatriate footballers
Expatriate footballers in Italy
Expatriate footballers in Spain
Expatriate footballers in England
Uruguayan expatriate sportspeople in Italy
Uruguayan expatriate sportspeople in Spain
Uruguayan expatriate sportspeople in England